The National Federation of Social Action (FNAS) is a trade union representing social security workers in France.

The union originated in 1955 as the National Autonomous and Interprofessional Syndicate of Inadapted Childhood.  Initially independent, in 1972, it affiliated to Workers' Force, and reformed as the National Federation of Social Action.  By 1995, it claimed 14,500 members.

General Secretaries
1972: François Kermoal
1983: Michel Pinaud
2005: Michel Paulini
2009: Pascal Corbex

References

External links

Public sector trade unions
Trade unions established in 1972
Trade unions in France